Sorted! The Best of Love and Rockets is a greatest hits album by English alternative rock band Love and Rockets. It was released on 3 June 2003.

Track listing

Personnel 

 Love and Rockets

 Daniel Ash – guitar
 Kevin Haskins – drums
 David J – artwork, bass guitar, concept, sleeve notes

 Production

 Fin Costello – photography
 Doug DeAngelis – production
 John Dent – mastering
 John Fryer – production
 Mitch Jenkins – photography
 Love and Rockets – production
 Oscar Marzaroli – photography
 Sylvia Massy – production
 John A. Rivers – production
 Derek Tompkins – assistant
 Steve Webbon – layout design

References

External links 

 

2003 greatest hits albums
Love and Rockets (band) albums
Albums produced by John Fryer (producer)
Beggars Banquet Records compilation albums